Dinesh Sudarshan Soi(born 17 May 1984) is an Indian actor, director, and casting director.

Career
Soi worked as an actor in Best of Luck Nikki (2011) on Disney Channel, Mann Kee Awaaz Pratigya (2012) on StarPlus, and Ishq Samunder (2016). He did the casting for films like Jatt Airways, Saat Saheliyan (2010), Yaara o Dildaara (2011), Main Krishna Hoon (2013), Ranviir The Marshal (2015), Fuddu (2016), Vodka Diaries (2018), Veerey Ki Wedding (2018), Nawabzaade (2018), Mohalla Assi (2018), and Family of Thakurganj (2019). Apart from films, he cast numerous TV programs and many a Music video.

Selected filmography

Casting director

Television as actor

Film as Actor

Director

References

External links

Living people
1980 births
Male actors in Hindi cinema
Indian male film actors
Indian casting directors